Afang may refer to:

 Epang Palace, or Afang Palace
 Gnetum africanum, or Afang, a vine
 Afang (soup)